Singel 24-7 was a Norwegian reality TV series that aired on TV3.

5 boys and 5 girls will live together in a house and try to find a partner. 2 people will try and split up the other couples. In Singel 24-7 none of the contestants will get voted out. The viewers can choose which contestants will be living together. In Singel 24-7 Direkte two of the couples will each week be split up.

The 2 single contestants will each week get an assignment where they will be competing against each other. The winner of the assignment will get to choose who he or she will be living with for the next week, and can also take him or her out on a romantic date. Who the other single contestant will be living with is the viewers choice.

Contestants
Contestants on Singel 24-7 

Anita N Jensen
23
Oslo/Kvinnherad
Sale

Ratings
The series opened with 252 000 viewers, but a week after Singel 24-7 had only 105 000 viewers. The final episode was watched by 64 000 viewers, and the whole series had an average of 62 000 viewers.

References

External links
Utelukker ikke sex (Norwegian)
Skal lete etter kjæreste i bunker (Norwegian)
Flau TV (Norwegian)

TV3 (Norway) original programming
Norwegian reality television series
2004 Norwegian television series debuts
2004 Norwegian television series endings
2000s Norwegian television series